Simon John Gibson (11 December 1964 – 10 April 2019) was an English footballer who played as a defender.

Career
Gibson started his career at Chelsea, where he played along side players such as Mickey Droy, Clive Walker and Paul Canoville. In October 1983 Gibson went on loan to Swindon Town. The loan was turned into a permanent move a few months later in November. One of Gibson's most notable performances took place on 19 November 1983  when Swindon beat Kettering Town 7–0 in the FA Cup and was on the score sheet. Gibson joined Preston North End in December 1984 and scored on his debut against Brentford. In April 1986 at a game against Colchester Gibson was sent off along with fellow teammate Bob Atkins which they lost 4–0. When Preston decided to changed from grass to a plastic pitch, Gibson was the last player to score on the old pitch in a 2–2 draw against Exeter City.

Personal life
Gibson was married with one daughter. He later moved to Sweden to play football, where he died after a fight with cancer. Gibson was cremated in Umeå, Swedish.

References

1964 births
2019 deaths
English footballers
Association football defenders
Chelsea F.C. players
Rochdale A.F.C. players
Doncaster Rovers F.C. players
Barnsley F.C. players
IFK Östersund players
Herfølge Boldklub players
Sandnes Ulf players
English Football League players
Footballers from Nottingham